Warriors Two is a 1978 Hong Kong martial arts film written and directed by Sammo Hung, who also co-stars in the film. The film stars Bryan Leung, Casanova Wong and Fung Hak-on. Leung plays the character of the historical figure, Leung Jan (or Leung Tsan), a well-known early practitioner of the Wing Chun style of kung fu. Leung's association with Wing Chun can be considered as the equivalent of Wong Fei-hung's association with the Hung Gar style.

Along with The Prodigal Son, Warriors Two is considered one of the best martial arts film displaying the authentic version of the Wing Chun style. Despite the title, Warriors Two is not a sequel. Rather it refers to the two main warriors of the film, and the literal translation of the Hong Kong title is "Mr. Tsang and Cashier Hua".

Plot
Mr. Tsan is a doctor and master of Wing Chun who can trace his martial lineage back to the style's founder. He is grudgingly persuaded by Fei Chun, his lead student, to teach kung fu to Cashier Hua, a patient hiding out at his residence. Hua had previously overheard a businessman named Mo and several of his men plotting to take over the town by killing the head of the town. Unfortunately, Hua made the mistake of warning Mo's wormy henchman, Master Yao and a trap was set that nearly cost the poor cashier his life. Whilst in hiding, Hua sends Fei Chun to warn the town head. Ignores the advice, the town head is later attacked by Mo's men, although it is unclear whether he escapes or is killed after a protracted fight.

Meanwhile, Tsan runs Hua through an elaborate series of Wing Chun training sessions before he falls victim to a vicious trap set by Mo who has learned of Hua's whereabouts. With nothing left to lose, Hua, Fei Chun, and Tsan's niece split up to use specific Wing Chun styles against Mo's leading fighters. Trouble mounts when it is discovered that Fei mixed up the fighter's names and each of Tsan's students have to improvise in order to win against their opponents.

Cast
Bryan Leung - Leung Jan/Master Tsang 
Sammo Hung - Kei Cheun
Casanova Wong - Cashier Wah 
Dean Shek - Master Yao 
Fung Hak-on - Mo 
Hoi Sang Lee - Iron Fist 
Lau Kar-wing - Town Chief's Bodyguard
Tiger Yang - Thunder Pai 
Yeung Wai - Tiger
Chin Yuet Sang - Leung's Student/Twin Swordsmen (2 roles)
Mang Hoi - Leung's Student/Twin Swordsmen (2 roles)
Billy Chan - Thunder's Men 
Peter Chan Lung - Rip off Kei 
Eric Tsang - Rip off Kei 
Lam Ching Ying - Thunder's Men
Yuen Biao - Thunder's Men 
Wellson Chin - Thunder's Men 
Chung Fat - Assassin Beggar 
Mars - Thunder's Men 
Choe Mu Ung - Town's Chief

See also
List of Hong Kong films
Sammo Hung filmography

External links
 
 
 Review at martiallife.com

1978 films
1978 martial arts films
1970s martial arts comedy films
1970s Cantonese-language films
Films directed by Sammo Hung
Golden Harvest films
Hong Kong films about revenge
Hong Kong martial arts comedy films
Kung fu films
1970s Hong Kong films